The Confessions of Amans is a 1977 American 16-mm drama film directed by Gregory Nava and written by Nava and his wife Anna Thomas.

The picture was partly funded by the American Film Institute.

Plot
In medieval Spain, an itinerant student of philosophy is hired by an uneducated lord to tutor his wife, but the student falls in love with her.

Production
The film was produced in Spain and on an estimated budget of $24,000, according to Roger Ebert. Nava used English stage performers. To conserve money, Nava and Thomas used costumes and props remaining from Samuel Bronston's El Cid. Film locations included the castles of ancient Segovia, Spain.

Cast
 William Bryan as Amans
 Michael St. John as Absalom
 Susannah MacMillan as Anne
 Leon Liberman as Arnolfo
 Feliciano Ituero Bravo as Nicholas
 Stephen Bateman as Landlord

Release
The Confessions of Amans was first presented in 1976 at the Chicago International Film Festival. The film opened in a limited theatrical release in New York on November 17, 1977.

Reception

Critical response
The New York Times film critic Vincent Canby wrote: "The Confessions of Amans was a very beautiful film, though not an especially pretty one, a chilly, tightly disciplined tale of the tragic love affair of a young philosophy tutor and the wife of the lord of the manor. Like the great Robert Bresson, Mr. Nava appeared to be less interested in the heat of the passion of the lovers than in the succession of moral choices their passion represented."

An unsigned film review in The New York Times held that the film is "a beautiful, muted film of the kind that takes some getting used to. People seldom raise their voices or lose control of themselves. Passion is expressed discreetly in glances or in the holding of hands."

Awards
Wins
 Chicago International Film Festival: Gold Hugo Award, Best First Feature Award, 1976.

References

External links
 
 

1977 films
1977 drama films
1977 independent films
Films directed by Gregory Nava
American independent films
Films set in Spain
Films set in the Middle Ages
1977 directorial debut films
1970s English-language films
1970s American films